Fara is a town in the Fara Department of Balé Province in southern Burkina Faso. It is the capital of the Fara Department and the town has a total population of 20,434.

References

External links
Satellite map at Maplandia.com

Populated places in the Boucle du Mouhoun Region
Balé Province